Robert Errington Rowell (born 29 August 1939) is an English retired rugby union player. His primary position was as a lock forward.  He was capped twice by England; both times against Wales, the first on 18 January 1964 in a 6-6 draw in the 1964 Five Nations Championship  at Twickenham, despite having never previously being so much as called up for a trial, and again a year later on 16 January 1965 in a 14–3 loss at the Cardiff Arms Park. He made 355 appearances for Leicester Tigers between 1962 and 1978; only Martin Johnson has played more times for Leicester at lock.  He was Leicester captain for the 1976–1977 season, and president in 2003.

References

1939 births
Living people
England international rugby union players
Leicester Tigers players
Rugby union locks
Rugby union players from Northumberland